Fire on Marzz (stylized in all caps) is the debut extended play by New Zealand recording artist Benee, released on 28 June 2019 through Republic Records.

Supported by four singles—"Soaked", "Evil Spider", "Want Me Back", and Glitter"—Fire on Marzz was critically and commercially successful, peaking at number 13 on the New Zealand Albums Chart and number 75 on the ARIA Albums Chart, and won Best Solo Artist at the 2019 New Zealand Music Awards.

Promotion
Fire on Marzz was preceded by four singles.

"Soaked" was released on 14 September 2018.

"Evil Spider" was released on 10 May 2019 as the EP's second single.

"Want Me Back" was released on 14 June 2019 as the EP's third single.

"Glitter" was released on 3 July 2019 as the EP's fourth and final single.

Critical reception

George Fenwick from The New Zealand Herald wrote: "Benee is a wise and perceptive songwriter with the pipes to match. She's able to flex her versatility across just six songs, and displays a crafty ability to think of her art outside the boundaries of its own format. With Fire on Marzz, Benee is here to set New Zealand pop music ablaze".

Awards and nominations
New Zealand Music Awards

! 
|-
! scope="row"| 2019
| Fire on Marzz
| Best Solo Artist
| 
| 
|}

Track listing

Personnel
Adapted from the Fire on Marzz / Stella & Steve compilation album's liner notes.

Musicians
 Stella Rose Bennett – writing, vocals 

Other musicians
 Josh Fountain – writing 
 Djeisan Suskov – writing 
 Jason Schoushkoff – writing

Technical
 Josh Fountain – production , mixing 
 David Wrench – mixing 
 Joe LaPorta – mastering

Charts

Weekly charts

Year-end charts

Certifications

Release history

References

Notes

External links
 

2019 debut EPs
Benee EPs
Albums produced by Josh Fountain
Republic Records EPs